Ulrich Reff (born 13 May 1943) is a German diver. He competed in the men's 3 metre springboard event at the 1968 Summer Olympics.

References

1943 births
Living people
German male divers
Olympic divers of West Germany
Divers at the 1968 Summer Olympics
People from Bezirk Dresden
20th-century German people